Air Chief Marshal Zaheer Ahmad Babar Sidhu  is a four-star air force general and the current 16th Chief of Air Staff of the Pakistan Air Force. On 19 March 2021, Babar took over command of the Pakistan Air Force from his predecessor ACM Mujahid Anwar Khan.

Personal life
Zaheer belongs to Sidh, Gujrat in the province of Punjab where his surname Sidhu is from.

Chauhdary Zaheer Babar Sidhu Born on 16 April 1965, into a Punjabi Muslim Jatt family from the Sidhu clan.

Career 
Air Chief Marshal Chauhdary Zaheer Ahmed Babar Sidhu was commissioned in GD (P) Branch of Pakistan Air Force in April, 1986. During his illustrious career, he has commanded a Fighter Squadron, a Flying Wing, an Operational Air Base and Regional Air Command. In his staff appointments, he has served as Assistant Chief of the Air Staff (Operational Requirement & Development), Assistant Chief of the Air Staff (Training-Officers) and Additional Secretary at Ministry of Defence. He has also served as Director General Projects, Director General Air Force Strategic Command, Deputy Chief of Air Staff (Air Defence) and Deputy Chief of the Air Staff (Administration) at Air Headquarters Islamabad.

He is a graduate of Combat Commanders' School (PAK), Command & Staff College (UK), National Defence University (PAK), and Royal College of Defence Studies (UK). He also holds a master's degree in Strategic Studies.
In recognition of his outstanding services, he has been awarded with Tamgha-i-lmtiaz (Military), Sitara-i-lmtiaz (Military), Hilal-i-lmtiaz (Military) and Nishan-i-lmtiaz (Military).

Chief of the Air Staff 
On 17 March 2021, Prime Minister of Pakistan Imran Khan appointed him as Chief of Air Staff and he assumed charge on 19 March 2021. He also met with Prime Minister Shahbaz Sharif on assuming office.

Awards and decorations

Foreign Decorations

Effective dates of promotion

References 

1965 births
Living people
Pakistani generals
Chiefs of Air Staff, Pakistan
Pakistan Air Force air marshals